Panau bretschneideri is a moth in the family Cossidae. It was described by Yakovlev in 2013. It is found in India (Arunachal Pradesh).

References

Natural History Museum Lepidoptera generic names catalog

Zeuzerinae
Moths described in 2013